Dubshatar is a 2010 Bangladeshi drama film directed by Nurul Alam Atique. It stars Jaya Ahsan in lead role. It had a television premiere, which deeply disappointed Atique.

Plot
A complicated relationship between a female social worker and a drug addict. Any confront involving several, any confront that you simply pass by each day within the street, any confront that is certainly an individual, your sis, your sibling, or even any individual else's. Each and every confront conveys to a tale, they will live any existence, apparently with their mundane, rich in drudgery and monotony. However, perhaps involving these kind of minutes regarding uninteresting drudgery, you will discover minutes regarding natural poems, exhilaration and enlightenment. The actual history regarding "In Too Deep" is just like that. Renu, once any tomboy, rich in existence and objectives, possesses entered your paradigm regarding "reality". She's been your eye regarding the girl older sibling, created window blind directly into this world. Your lover presented shade inside his / her world, since the girl world becomes grey. She's been agreeing to the globe. The woman's fantasy and the girl fact are usually including two distant exoplanets. The woman's avoid will become the girl interest, consumed about, since a kind of obsession, with the distant and aloof world of your recluse male. The woman's discussion with your pet bears any strange fruits. And the lady attempts to find the girl responses all-around the girl, by the girl child years to be able to the girl goals and beyond. Can your adjusting tides all around the girl carry the girl reply?

Cast
 Joya Ahsan as Renuka Rahman
 Arafat Hossain as Rokon
 Ashoke Bepari as Rokon
 Shahriar Shuvo as Rehan
 Wahida Mollick Jolly as Mother
 Debangshu Hore as Pakhi
 Tinni as Punom
 Shadhin Khosru as Sunny
 Sushoma Sarkar as Mithila
 Rudro Shahriar as Imran
 Qazi Apu as Renu's Colleague1
 Kakoli as Colleague 2
 Shamim Visti as Colleague 3
 Swagata as Diveya 
 Sadnima as Renu, Kid 
 Kunal as Rokon, Kid
 Meena as Mother, Young
 Shawjib as Mustan 
 Junaid Halim as Shopkeeper

Reception

Critical response
The Daily Star rated the film 2 out of 5 saying "Another extraordinary acting by Jaya Ahsan saves this dull movie".

References

External links

Bengali-language Bangladeshi films
2010s Bengali-language films
Films directed by Nurul Alam Atique
Impress Telefilm films